Vynohradiv is a city in western Ukraine, in Zakarpattia Oblast. It was the center of Vynohradiv Raion and since 2020 it has been incorporated into Berehove Raion. Population:

Names

Sewlusz).

Location
The city lies near the river Tisza on the border with Romania.

History
It was first mentioned in 1262 by the name Zceuleus. Its Hungarian name, Nagyszőlős ("Great Vineyard"), stems from the area being an important wine district. The city was called Sevlush (the Rusyn transliteration of the Hungarian word szőlős, meaning vineyard.

The town was one of the oldest in Ugocsa county, and was inhabited by winemakers of the royal court. In 1329, Hungarian King Charles Robert granted privileges to the town, which became the seat of the Comitatus (the city held this rank until the Treaty of Trianon was signed in 1920).

In 1717, most of the citizens of the town were killed by an invading Tatar horde. By 1880, the population was about 4,400 (with 500 native Romanians). In 1881 a secondary school was opened.

In 1910 it had a population of 7,811 (5,943 or 76% Hungarians, 1,266 or 16% Ruthenians (Rusyns) and 540 or 7% Germans). The religious make-up was 3,311 Greek Catholics (42.5%), 2,237 Jews (28.6%) and 1,124 Calvinists (14.4%).

This city had a Jewish ghetto in 1944. At its height from May to June 1944, most of the Jews of this section of northern Transylvania were deported to the Auschwitz concentration camp to be gassed shortly after arrival. Jews from the area typically spent about two weeks in the ghetto before being deported. Conditions were extremely cramped with many families housed in a single room, a deliberate arrangement meant to cause suffering and disease.

In 1944, Carpathian Ruthenia was occupied by Soviet Union and eventually became part of it in 1946. The city name became Vinogradovo (Russian), Vynohradiv (Ukrainian), or Vynohradovo (Rusyn). All mean "Grape City."

A local newspaper is published here since December 1945.

Demographics

According to the 2001 census, the population included:
Ukrainians (82.13%)
Hungarians (13.54%)
Russians (3.82%)
Roma (0.6%)

Tourist sights

Ugocsa Castle "Kankó" (ruins; 13th century). It was first mentioned in 1308. In 1315 King Charles Robert attacked and destroyed it. In the 15th century the area was given to monks of the Franciscan order, they built a monastery there, which was inhabited until 1558. There is a small 14th century chapel south of the ruins.
Perényi Castle. It was built by the Perényi noble family from 1399, later rebuilt in baroque style into a mansion.
Franciscan church and monastery (built in 1744, rebuilt in 1889).
Our Lady's Church (13th century, rebuilt in the 15th century in Gothic style, restored in the early 20th century. Its furniture was destroyed after 1945. The Church got it back in 1989.
Franciscan monastery (founded in the 15th century). In 1556 local Protestants attacked the monastery, killed the monks and threw the body of St. John Capistrano into a well. The Perényi family invited monks of the order to the town again, but the monastery burnt down in 1747. Its current building was erected in 1889.
Protestant church (Neoclassical, 1828).
Old county hall (now the building of the Zsigmond Perényi Secondary School) and statue of Perényi (1906).

Famous people
In alphabetical order:
Composer Béla Bartók (born 1881) lived in the house opposite the mansion in 1889–92; his mother worked as a teacher. Bartók held his first recital here in the county hall.
Ethella Chupryk, pianist and assistant professor of piano at the Mykola Lysenko National Music Academy
József Csorba, doctor and physicist, was born here in 1789.
Gábor Döbrentei, philologist and antiquarian, was born here in 1786.
Mykhaylo Koman, footballer and coach of Dynamo Kyiv, was raised here.
János Majos (died 1810), Kuruc captain, was born here.
Edvin Marton, born Lajos Csűry in 1974, composer and violinist.
Endre Nagy, writer and stage director, was born here in 1877.
Eleanor Perenyi, American author, lived here in 1937–40 as the wife of a Hungarian nobleman.
Imre Révész, painter, was born here in 1859 and is buried in the local cemetery.

Other names
Rusyn: Cивлюш (Syvlyush), Севлюш (Sevlyush) -- before 1946
, 

Yiddish: סעליש (Seylesh, Selish)

Economy
One of the biggest employers in Vynohradiv is the Gentherm.

International relations

Twin towns — Sister cities
Vynohradiv is twinned with:
 Nyírbátor in Hungary
 Fehérgyarmat in Hungary
 Dynów in Poland
 Vranov nad Topľou in Slovakia
 Celadas in Spain

References

External links

Panoramio Maps
Wikimapia Maps
Gentherm

Cities in Zakarpattia Oblast
Cities of district significance in Ukraine
Holocaust locations in Ukraine